Nicholas "Nick" Mark A'Hern (born 6 January 1969 in Swansea, Wales) is a retired Australian race walker, who won gold medals at the Commonwealth Games in both Victoria (1994) and Kuala Lumpur (1998). He represented his country at three Summer Olympics (1992, 1996 and 2000) and also raced at five editions of the World Championships in Athletics (1991–1999). His best placing on the global stage was fourth in the 20 kilometres race walk at the 1996 Atlanta Olympics.

On 14 July 2000, A'Hern was awarded the Australian Sports Medal for his achievements.

Achievements

References

External links

Profile
ABC Profile

1969 births
Living people
Australian male racewalkers
Sportspeople from Swansea
Olympic athletes of Australia
Athletes (track and field) at the 1992 Summer Olympics
Athletes (track and field) at the 1994 Commonwealth Games
Athletes (track and field) at the 1996 Summer Olympics
Athletes (track and field) at the 1998 Commonwealth Games
Athletes (track and field) at the 2000 Summer Olympics
Commonwealth Games gold medallists for Australia
Commonwealth Games medallists in athletics
Recipients of the Australian Sports Medal
Australian Institute of Sport track and field athletes
Competitors at the 1990 Goodwill Games
Medallists at the 1994 Commonwealth Games
Medallists at the 1998 Commonwealth Games